American Fork Hospital is a hospital located in American Fork, Utah, United States, is fully accredited by the Joint Commission on Accreditation of Healthcare Organizations, and is a service of Intermountain Healthcare, a nonprofit health care system serving the Intermountain West. Hospital services include a 27-suite women's center that features single-room birthing and a 17-bed emergency department.

In 2021, American Fork Hospital opened a newborn intensive care unit. The facility has 20 individual rooms and can help babies born as early as 32 weeks after conception. 2,500 to 3,000 babies per year are born at American Fork Hospital.

See also

 List of hospitals in Utah

References

External links

 
 Intermountain Healthcare - Official Homepage

Hospital buildings completed in 1937
Intermountain Health
Hospitals in Utah County, Utah
Buildings and structures in American Fork, Utah
Hospitals established in 1937
1937 establishments in Utah